Calidota is a genus of moths in the family Erebidae. The genus was erected by Harrison Gray Dyar Jr. in 1901.

Species
Calidota bahamensis Rothschild, 1933
Calidota clarcana Dyar, 1916
Calidota divina (Schaus, 1889)
Calidota guzmani Beutelspacher, [1981]
Calidota lubeckei Beutelspacher, [1986]
Calidota obscurata (Druce, 1884)
Calidota paulina (E. D. Jones, 1912)
Calidota phryganoides (Walker, 1855)
Calidota strigosa (Walker, 1855) – streaked calidota moth

Former species
Calidota cubensis (Grote, 1865)
Calidota hadesia Schaus, 1927

References

External links

Phaegopterina
Moth genera